is a former Japanese football player.

Club career
Iio was born in Ninohe on February 23, 1982. He joined Verdy Kawasaki (later Tokyo Verdy) from youth team in 1999. In 2000, he played many matches as forward.

Iio made a name for himself when he scored Verdy's first goal in the final of the 2004 Emperor's Cup. The match ended in a 2-1 victory for Verdy over Júbilo Iwata. Kazuki Hiramoto netted Verdy's second, whilst Norihiro Nishi provided Júbilo's consolation. It was the first time Verdy had won the Emperor's Cup since 1996.

Upon Iio's transfer to Avispa Fukuoka in 2006, he received a relatively high squad number of 34. Despite this, he quickly established himself as a first-choice striker. During the 2006 season, Avispa would usually play with two men up front, with Iio on the left, and Takanori Nunobe to his right.

Iio's first J1 League appearance for Avispa came against FC Tokyo on 19 July 2006, when he came on as an 84th-minute substitute for fellow striker Mitsunori Yabuta. This game was held at the Hakatanomori Football Stadium, and ended in a goalless draw. 
Iio would not have to wait long for his first Avispa goal however, as just 10 days later, on the 29 July 2006 contest between Gamba Osaka and Avispa, Iio netted a goal in a match that eventually ended in a 2-2 draw.

Following Avispa's relegation, Iio returned to Verdy for the start of the 2007 season. Iio would appear regularly for Verdy in this campaign, occasionally even appearing as a right-winger in Verdy's midfield. He finished the campaign with 19 games, scoring 2 goals.

He moved to Yokohama FC in 2014. However he could hardly play in the match and he left the club end of 2015 season.

National team career
Iio has represented Japan U-20 national team, but has yet to be given a full international cap. Iio was selected for the 2001 World Youth Championship, along with his strike partner at Tokyo Verdy, Kazuki Hiramoto. At this tournament, he played all 3 matches.

Club statistics

References

External links

1982 births
Living people
Association football people from Iwate Prefecture
Japanese footballers
Japan youth international footballers
J1 League players
J2 League players
Tokyo Verdy players
Kawasaki Frontale players
Avispa Fukuoka players
Yokohama FC players
Association football midfielders